Shoot for the Moon is the third album by country music artist Linda Davis, It was her first to achieve placement on the Billboard Music Charts. It was the first album released following a win at the 1993 Grammy Awards for Best Country Vocal Collaboration (with country superstar Reba McEntire) for their hit "Does He Love You." The album rose to the number 28 position on the Country Albums chart, and two of its tracks were relatively minor hits on the singles charts: "Company Time" at number 43, and "Love Didn't Do It" at number 58. The former was previously recorded by Mac McAnally on his 1990 album Simple Life.

"In Pictures" was later recorded by Alabama on their 1995 album of the same name.

Reception
Tim DuBois, president of Arista's Nashville division, said that "we rushed it" after Davis won a Grammy Award for her duet with Reba McEntire on "Does He Love You". Billboard reviewed the album favorably, praising John Guess's "punchy but rootsy" production and Davis's singing voice, while considering "Company Time", "A Family Tie", and the title track as the strongest cuts.

Track listing
"Shoot for the Moon" (Harry Robinson, Chapin Hartford) – 3:15
"Company Time" (Mac McAnally) – 3:21
"If Promises Were Gold" (Shawna Harrington-Burkhart, Karl Hasten) – 3:15
"Love Didn't Do It" (Steven Dale Jones, Bobby Tomberlin) – 2:44
"He's in Dallas" (Johnny MacRae, Richard Ross, Donny Kees) – 3:02
"When You Took Your Love Away" (Skip Ewing, Liz Hengber) – 2:57
"How Can I Make You Love Me?" (Linda Davis, Jim Weatherly) – 3:27
"Don't You Want My Love?" (Ewing, Don Sampson) – 3:06
"In Pictures" (Joe Doyle, Bobby E. Boyd) – 3:10
"A Family Tie" (Hugh Prestwood) – 3:28

Production
Produced & Mixed By John Guess
Production Co-Ordination: Big Cheese, Lauren Koch
Engineered By Marty Williams
Assistant Engineer: Derek Bason
Mastered By Glenn Meadows

Personnel
Drums, Percussion: Paul Leim
Bass guitar: Joe Chemay
Keyboards: Steve Nathan, Gary Prim
Acoustic Guitar: Mark Casstevens, Skip Ewing, Randy Scruggs
Electric Guitar: Steve Gibson, Dann Huff, Chris Leuzinger 
Steel Guitar: Terry Crisp, Paul Franklin
Dobro: Jerry Douglas
Mandolin: Mark Casstevens, Steve Gibson
Fiddle: Stuart Duncan
Lead Vocals: Linda Davis
Background Vocals: Michael Black, Linda Davis, Vicki Hampton, Mac McAnally

Chart performance

References

1994 albums
Arista Records albums
Linda Davis albums